Butler Branch refers to the following rail lines:
Butler Branch (Indiana) of the Pennsylvania Railroad
Butler Branch (Pennsylvania) of the Pennsylvania Railroad